Freedom Akinmoladun (born February 11, 1996) is an American football defensive end for the St. Louis BattleHawks of the XFL. He was signed by the New York Giants as an undrafted free agent in 2019 following his college football career with the Nebraska Cornhuskers.

Professional career

New York Giants
Akinmoladun signed with the New York Giants as an undrafted free agent following the 2019 NFL Draft on May 14, 2019. He was waived during final roster cuts on August 31, 2019, and signed to the team's practice squad the next day. He was released on November 12, 2019.

Cincinnati Bengals
Akinmoladun signed to the Cincinnati Bengals' practice squad on November 19, 2019. He was promoted to the active roster on December 14, 2019.

Akinmoladun was waived during final roster cuts on September 5, 2020, and signed to the team's practice squad the next day. He was elevated to the team's active roster on September 17 for the team's week 2 game against the Cleveland Browns and reverted to the practice squad the next day. He was elevated again to the team's active roster on October 3 for the week 4 game against the Jacksonville Jaguars, and reverted to the practice squad after the game. He was placed on the practice squad/COVID-19 list by the team on November 18, 2020, and restored to the practice squad on December 2. He signed a reserve/future contract on January 4, 2021. He was waived on August 22, 2021.

Tennessee Titans
On August 24, 2021, Akinmoladun was claimed off waivers by the Tennessee Titans. He was waived on August 29, 2021.

New York Jets
On December 21, 2021, Akinmoladun was signed to the New York Jets practice squad.

Philadelphia Stars
Akinmoladun was selected with the sixth pick of the second round of the 2022 USFL Draft by the Philadelphia Stars.

St. Louis BattleHawks
The St. Louis BattleHawks selected Akinmoladun in the first round of the 2023 XFL Supplemental Draft on January 1, 2023.

References

External links
Cincinnati Bengals bio

1996 births
Living people
People from Grandview, Missouri
Players of American football from Missouri
Sportspeople from the Kansas City metropolitan area
American football defensive tackles
Nebraska Cornhuskers football players
New York Giants players
Cincinnati Bengals players
Tennessee Titans players
New York Jets players
Philadelphia Stars (2022) players
St. Louis BattleHawks players